Late Bloomers is a 2011 romantic comedy-drama film directed by Julie Gavras and starring William Hurt and Isabella Rossellini. The film premiered on 18 February 2011 at the 61st Berlin International Film Festival. It was released theatrically in France on 13 July 2011 by the Gaumont Film Company.

Plot
A couple, Adam (William Hurt) and Mary (Isabella Rossellini), are both heading into their sixties, but react to this differently. A retired teacher, Mary begins to make adjustments to their home to make it more practical for their age. Adam is defensive to any changes and fiercely defends his progression as an architect. They live in London, next door to Mary's mother, Nora, who raised her daughter in Italy. Mary worries about an incident of memory loss and her doctor prescribes her to keep active. Adam, insulted by an offer to design a retirement home, instead turns his attention to the proposal of a young associate, Maya (Arta Dobroshi), to participate in a competition to design a new museum. Adam becomes nocturnal, working on the project overnight with young associates. Mary becomes used to an increasingly empty home, but attracts an admirer at the gym.

Cast
 William Hurt as Adam
 Isabella Rossellini as Mary
 Doreen Mantle as Nora
 Kate Ashfield as Giulia
 Arta Dobroshi as Maya
 Luke Treadaway as Benjamin
 Leslie Phillips as Leo
 Hugo Speer as Peter
 Joanna Lumley as Charlotte
 Simon Callow as Richard
Aidan McArdle as James

Reception
Late Bloomers has received mixed reviews from critics. Rotten Tomatoes gave the film a score of 43%, based on 14 reviews. Metacritic gave the film a rating of 53/100, based on 10 reviews.

References

External links
 

2011 films
2011 romantic comedy-drama films
Belgian romantic comedy-drama films
British romantic comedy-drama films
English-language Belgian films
English-language French films
Films about architecture
Films about couples
Films set in London
Films shot in London
French romantic comedy-drama films
Gaumont Film Company films
2010s British films
2010s French films